The 2019 Three Rivers District Council election took place on 2 May 2019 to elect members of Three Rivers District Council in England. This was the same day as other local elections.

Results Summary

Results by Ward

Abbots Langley & Bedmond

Carpenders Park

Chorleywood North and Sarratt

Chorleywood South & Maple Cross

Dickinsons

Durrants

Gade Valley

Leavesden

Moor Park & Eastbury

Oxhey Hall & Hayling

Penn & Mill End

Rickmansworth Town

South Oxhey

References 

Three Rivers District Council elections
Three Rivers
May 2019 events in the United Kingdom
2010s in Hertfordshire